Lac Departure is a lake in Petit-Mécatina, Le Golfe-du-Saint-Laurent Regional County Municipality, in the Côte-Nord region of Quebec, Canada. It is in the Gulf of Saint Lawrence drainage basin.

The lake has one unnamed inflow, at the north, and one unnamed outflow at the south. That outflow eventually reaches Lac Ruel, which empties via the Rivière de Salmon Bay to Baie Salmon on the Gulf of Saint Lawrence.

References

Departure